John Henry Ritchie (12 July 1941 – 23 February 2007) was an English footballer. He is Stoke City's all-time record goalscorer.

Ritchie began his career with his hometown club Kettering Town before joining Stoke City in 1962. In his first full season as a professional Ritchie scored an impressive 30 goals and hit 81 goals in 135 appearances. He was surprisingly sold by Tony Waddington to Sheffield Wednesday in November 1966 for £80,000. After scored 45 goals for Wednesday in three seasons Waddington decided that selling Ritchie was a mistake and re-signed him for £28,000. He continued to be a prolific goalscorer for Stoke City and helped them win their first major trophy, the 1972 Football League Cup and reach two FA Cup semi finals. He remained at Stoke until September 1974 when a broken leg ended his career. He had scored 176 goals for Stoke in 351 matches making him Stoke's record goalscorer.

Career
Born in Kettering, Ritchie is Stoke City's top marksman of all-time having scored 176 goals in 351 games during two spells at the club, from June 1962 to November 1966, and from July 1969 to May 1975.

In September 1961 Stoke City manager Tony Waddington was in a telephone conversation with a fellow manager who bemoaned the fact despite finding a fine non-league player his club could not afford him. At the end of that conversation Waddington rang around several colleagues to ask about John Ritchie, and he learned of a big strong striker who had scored 40 goals for non-league Kettering Town. Impressed by what he heard Waddington contacted Kettering and completed the deal immediately despite never seeing him play. Ritchie actually took a pay drop to join Stoke as he had been working in a local shoe factory and playing part-time. In his first season at Stoke Ritchie only made sporadic appearances while Dennis Viollet and Jackie Mudie held sway in the first team.

Three months into the 1963–64 season he was given his chance in place of the injured Viollet. Ritchie grabbed it with both hands and scored twice in a 4–3 win over Bolton Wanderers. That sparked a scoring streak of fifteen goals in nine games, breaking Jack Peart's 1910 club record for scoring in consecutive matches, although only six of Ritchie's were in the League. The run was rounded off in a 4–4 draw against Sheffield Wednesday by Ritchie's first hat-trick. He also set a formative record for the club in the League Cup scoring ten goals which has only been beaten twice. Ritchie's goals helped Stoke reach their first ever cup final, the 1964 Football League Cup. Stoke played two legs against Leicester City and lost 4–3. He twice scored four in a match, against Sheffield Wednesday in April 1965 and Northampton Town in February 1966 a feat not to be matched until 2000.

Ritchie scored thirty goals in his first full season as a professional and 29 the following season and was a firm terrace favourite. It came as a huge shock then when in November 1966 he was sold to Sheffield Wednesday for £80,000. It was even more surprising as Stoke had sold reserve forward John Woodward to Aston Villa for £30,000. Tony Waddington later admitted that selling Ritchie was a mistake. Ritchie's time at Hillsborough was not that great as after two good seasons he had a poor 1968–69 campaign and new Wednesday manager Danny Williams decided that he was past his best and Waddington took the chance to rectify his error and bought him back for £28,000.

Ritchie returned as Jimmy Greenhoff arrived, and the pair struck a productive partnership which the local media described as 'telepathic'. Ritchie top scored in 1970–71, 1971–72 and 1973–74 as he helped Stoke reach two FA Cup semi finals in 1971 and 1972, losing both times to Arsenal. Stoke did reach the 1972 Football League Cup Final and beat Chelsea 2–1 to claim their first major trophy. Ritchie continued to play for Stoke until he broke his leg in September 1974 ending his career. He scored a club record 176 goals in 351 appearances for Stoke.

After football
The 6 foot 2 hitman ended his career after a double leg fracture in 1975. After retiring from football, he concentrated on his pottery business based in Stoke. John Ritchie died on 23 February 2007 at the age of 65. His son David was on the books at Stoke in the late 1989 but never made an appearance being sold to Stockport County for £10,000 in March 1990.

Style of play
Standing 6 ft 2 in tall and weighing 12 st 4 lbs, Ritchie was christened 'Big' John Ritchie by Stoke supporters. He was one of a dying breed of direct and fast centre forwards in the mould of a Freddie Steele, Tommy Lawton and Nat Lofthouse, Ritchie used his burly frame to good effect, shrugging off defenders with ease.

Legacy
He is remembered by a bust behind the Boothen End at Stoke's Bet365 Stadium. On the bust is a plaque which reads:

Career statistics
Source:

Honours
Stoke City
Football League Second Division champion: 1962–63
Football League Cup winner: 1972
Football League Cup runner-up: 1964
Watney Cup winner: 1973

References

External links

1941 births
2007 deaths
English footballers
Kettering Town F.C. players
Stoke City F.C. players
Sheffield Wednesday F.C. players
Sportspeople from Kettering
Footballers from Stoke-on-Trent
English Football League players
English Football League representative players
Association football forwards